This table provides a list of notable members of The American Legion.

A

B

C

D

E

F

G

H

I

J

K

L

M

N

O

P

R

S

T

U

V

W

Y

Z

References

External links

 

Members
American Legion
American Legion